In August 2022, flash floods hit Datong Hui and Tu Autonomous County. At least 16 people have been killed and 36 others are missing in Qinghai Province. According to CCTV News, a sudden rainstorm triggered a landslide that diverted a river.

References

2022 floods in Asia
Floods in China
August 2022 events in China
Floods
2022 disasters in China